Leonard Henry Piper (born 8 August 1977) is an English former professional footballer. Born in London, he began his career with Wimbledon but in 1996 moved to Gillingham for a transfer fee of £40,000. He made 24 appearances for the Kent-based club, including 20 in The Football League, before dropping into non-league football after suffering a broken leg.  He proved a fans' favourite at St Albans City, making 98 appearances and scoring 28 goals in just two seasons at the club, before moving to Farnborough in July 2000 where he made 80 appearances in the Football Conference.  He later played for Dagenham & Redbridge and Margate. In 2009, he signed for Whyteleafe.

References

External links
Soccerbase listing

1977 births
Living people
English footballers
Wimbledon F.C. players
Gillingham F.C. players
St Albans City F.C. players
Dagenham & Redbridge F.C. players
Margate F.C. players
Welling United F.C. players
Whyteleafe F.C. players
Association football midfielders